Kadamakkudy Islands is an island suburb of the city of Kochi in the Indian state of Kerala. It is situated around 8 km (6 mi) north of the city centre.

Geography 
Kadamakkudy Islands is a cluster of fourteen islands: Valiya Kadamakudy (the main island), Murikkal, Palyam Thuruth, Pizhala, Cheriya Kadamakudy, Pulikkapuram, Moolampilly, Puthussery, Chariyam Thuruth, Chennur, Kothad, Korambadam, Kandanad and Karikkad Thuruthu.

The Grama panchayth is administered under the kerala Panchayth Raj system and the present administrators are The President Smt Shalini Babu and The Panchayth Secretary Sri Dylan Tom

Demographics

 India census, Kadamakkudy islands had a population of 15,823. Males constitute 49% of the population and females 51%. Kadamakkudy has an average literacy rate of 84%, higher than the national average of 59.5%: male literacy is 86%, and female literacy is 82%. In Kadamakkudy islands, 11% of the population is under 6 years of age.

Religion 
Kadamakkudy islands have 9 Catholic Churches.

Venerable Mar Varghese Payyappilly Palakkappilly had served as the parish priest of Valiya Kadamakkudy Syrian Catholic Church (1909–11).

References

Cities and towns in Ernakulam district
Suburbs of Kochi